José Pimenta (born 30 December 1899 – after 1928) was a Portuguese footballer who played as a forward for Benfica. He was also in the military.

He made his debut on Benfica on 29 December 1918 in Lisbon, against Sporting, in a 3-1 victory. The next year he won the 1919/20 edition of the regional championship Campeonato de Lisboa.

By 1925, he was the captain of Benfica's team. He retired in 1928, concluding his decade-long career in the club.

References 

1899 births
Portuguese footballers
Association football forwards
S.L. Benfica footballers
Year of death unknown